Jonathan Charles Gray (born November 5, 1991) is an American professional baseball pitcher for the Texas Rangers of Major League Baseball (MLB). He previously played for the Colorado Rockies. 

Gray played college baseball for Eastern Oklahoma State College and the University of Oklahoma. The Rockies chose Gray with the third pick in the 2013 MLB draft, and he made his MLB debut in 2015. After pitching for the Rockies through the 2021 season, Gray signed with the Rangers as a free agent before the 2022 season.

Amateur career
Attending Chandler High School in Chandler, Oklahoma, Grey played baseball, basketball, and football for the Lions, focusing on baseball his senior year. That year, he was named the Little All-City Player of the Year by The Oklahoman and was named to the All-State Team.

The Kansas City Royals selected Gray in the 13th round of the 2010 Major League Baseball (MLB) Draft, but he did not sign. Oklahoma Sooners baseball coach Sunny Golloway encouraged Gray to enroll at Eastern Oklahoma State College, a junior college in Wilburton, Oklahoma, where he could continue to gain experience as a starting pitcher, as he would be used as a relief pitcher if he were to join the Sooners that season. For Eastern Oklahoma, Gray pitched to a 6–2 win–loss record and a 2.89 earned run average (ERA). The New York Yankees drafted him in the 10th round of the 2011 MLB Draft and offered him $500,000 to sign, but he instead opted to transfer to the University of Oklahoma. In his sophomore year at Oklahoma, Gray compiled a 3.16 ERA and 104 strikeouts in  innings pitched.

As a junior, Gray was named the Big 12 Conference Pitcher of the Week three times. He had a 10–3 win–loss record, a 1.64 ERA, and 147 strikeouts in  innings pitched. He was a first team All-American and a unanimous choice for the All-Big 12 team. He was named the Most Outstanding Player of the 2013 Big 12 Conference baseball tournament, as Oklahoma won the tournament for the first time since 1997. Gray also won the National Pitcher of the Year Award.

Professional career

Minor leagues (2013–2015)
Gray was expected to be among the first players chosen in the 2013 MLB Draft, and was considered by the Houston Astros, who had the first overall pick. The Colorado Rockies eventually picked him with the third pick. Gray signed with the Rockies, receiving a $4.8 million signing bonus, which was below the recommended slot value for the pick. Gray made his professional debut with the Grand Junction Rockies of the Rookie-level Pioneer League in July, before receiving a promotion to the Modesto Nuts of the Class A-Advanced California League later in the month. For Modesto, Gray pitched to a 0.75 ERA with 36 strikeouts in 24 innings.

The Rockies invited Gray to spring training in 2014. They assigned him to the Tulsa Drillers of the Class AA Texas League for the 2014 season. He pitched to a 10–5 record, a 3.91 ERA, and 113 strikeouts in  innings. He missed the first round of the Texas League playoffs due to a tired shoulder. The Rockies invited Gray to spring training in 2015. They assigned him to the Albuquerque Isotopes of the Class AAA Pacific Coast League to start the 2015 season. Gray pitched to a 6–6 win–loss record with a 4.33 ERA and 110 strikeouts in 21 games, including a 2.70 ERA in his last six starts.

Colorado Rockies (2015–2021)
Gray made his major league debut with the Rockies on August 4, 2015. Focusing on his fastball and slider, Gray pitched to a 0–2 record and a 5.53 ERA in nine starts for the Rockies. During the 2015–16 offseason, Gray worked to add a curveball.

Gray missed the beginning of the 2016 season due to a strained abdominal muscle. On May 13, Gray earned his first career major league win in a 5–2 victory over the New York Mets. He finished the 2016 season with a 10–10 record, a 4.61 ERA, and 185 strikeouts in 168 innings pitched.

In 2017, the Rockies named Gray their Opening Day starting pitcher. He went on the disabled list in April with a stress fracture in his left foot. On July 5, Gray hit his first career home run off of Cincinnati Reds pitcher Scott Feldman, which measured . Gray finished the season winning 10 games in 20 starts and a 3.67 ERA. Gray started for the Rockies in the 2017 National League Wild Card Game, which the Rockies lost to the Arizona Diamondbacks.

Gray started for the Rockies on Opening Day in 2018, but he began the 2018 season with a 5.77 ERA in his first 17 starts. On June 20, 2018, he was optioned to Triple-A Albuquerque. He was recalled on July 13. Gray ended the regular season with a 5.12 ERA and 27 home runs allowed. The Rockies did not include Gray on their postseason roster for the 2018 National League Division Series. In August 2019, Gray's season ended due to the diagnosis of a stress fracture in his left foot. In 2019, he had an 11–8 record and a 3.84 ERA in 25 starts. In 2020, Gray's season was cut short due to right shoulder inflammation as he pitched in only eight starts. He finished with a 2–4 record and a 6.69 ERA.

In 2021, Gray posted an ERA of 4.59 in 29 starts. He struck out 157 batters in 149 innings. After the season, the Rockies opted not to make a qualifying offer of $18.4 million for the 2022 season to Gray, and he became a free agent.

Texas Rangers (2022–present)
On December 1, 2021, Gray signed a four-year, $56 million contract with the Texas Rangers. He started for the Rangers on Opening Day, but developed a blister on his right middle finger during the game and went on the injured list the next day. He returned to make his second start for Texas on April 19, and went back on the injured list with a sprained medial collateral ligament in his left knee. Over 24 games for Texas in 2022, Gray posted a 7–7 record with a 3.96 ERA and 134 strikeouts over  innings.

Personal life

Gray is married. His grandfather was Cherokee, and Gray is a citizen of the Cherokee Nation. His brother, Jack, played linebacker at Northeastern State University, and became the head high school football coach for the Chandler Lions in Oklahoma. Their father, also named Jack, was a successful baseball player at Chandler High and later joined the United States military. He also coached Gray's Little League teams.

Since he was 10 years old, Gray has been interested in ghosts and he uses equipment for ghost hunting in hotels.

References

External links

1991 births
Living people
People from Chandler, Oklahoma
Sportspeople from Shawnee, Oklahoma
All-American college baseball players
Baseball players from Oklahoma
Major League Baseball pitchers
Colorado Rockies players
Texas Rangers players
Oklahoma Sooners baseball players
Eastern Oklahoma Mountaineers baseball players
Grand Junction Rockies players
Modesto Nuts players
Tulsa Drillers players
Albuquerque Isotopes players